Aleksandr Sergeyevich Grishin (born 18 November 1971) is a Russian professional football coach and a former player. He is assistant coach with FC Olimp-Dolgoprudny.

Honours
 Soviet Top League champion: 1991.
 Soviet Top League runner-up: 1990.
 Russian Premier League runner-up: 1998.
 Russian Premier League bronze: 1999.
 Soviet Cup winner: 1991.
 Soviet Cup runner-up: 1992.
 Russian Cup finalist: 1993, 1994, 1997.

European club competitions
 UEFA Champions League 1992–93 with PFC CSKA Moscow: 7 games, 2 goals.
 UEFA Cup Winners' Cup 1995–96 with FC Dynamo Moscow: 6 games.
 UEFA Cup 1996–97 with FC Dynamo Moscow: 4 games.

External links 
 

1971 births
Footballers from Moscow
Living people
Soviet footballers
Soviet Union youth international footballers
Soviet Union under-21 international footballers
Russian footballers
Russia under-21 international footballers
FC Lokomotiv Moscow players
PFC CSKA Moscow players
Soviet Top League players
Russian Premier League players
FC Dynamo Moscow players
FC Fakel Voronezh players
FC Shinnik Yaroslavl players
FC Rubin Kazan players
FC Luch Vladivostok players
FC SKA Rostov-on-Don players
FC Salyut Belgorod players
Association football midfielders
Association football defenders
Russian football managers
Russian expatriate football managers
Expatriate football managers in Latvia